Muhammad Afiq bin Mat Noor (born 25 December 1993) is a Singaporean professional footballer who last played as a central-midfielder or centre-back for Singapore Premier League club Hougang United

Career

Young Lions FC
Formerly from the Warriors's prime league, he represented Singapore in 2012 in the regional finals of the Nike "The Chance" which were held in Jakarta together with Faris Ramli and Sim Li Ming.

He made his senior debut for Courts Young Lions on 20 February 2013 and go on to play 51 times for the lions.

Hougang United
In 2016, he signed for the Cheetah after being released by the Young Lions.

For 2017, he will continue his career with the Cheetah after signing an extension with the team.

International career
He was the captain for the Under-21 National Team that took part in the Vietnam Youth Newspaper Cup in October 2015.

He was also part of the 2015 SEA Games Football Squad.

Club

. Caps and goals may not be correct.

 Young Lions are ineligible for qualification to AFC competitions.

References

External links 

1993 births
Living people
Singaporean footballers
Association football midfielders
Singapore Premier League players
Young Lions FC players